Aglaomorpha quercifolia (synonym Drynaria quercifolia), commonly known as the oakleaf fern or oakleaf basket fern, is a species of Aglaomorpha in the family Polypodiaceae. Other common names for the fern are pakpak lawin, gurar, koi hin, ashvakatri, kabkab, kabkaban, or uphatkarul.

Distribution
Aglaomorpha quercifolia is native to India, Southeast Asia, Malaysia, Indonesia, the Philippines, New Guinea, and Australia.

Description
It is a large species with deeply pinnatifid foliage fronds. The nest fronds resemble the leaves of oaks, hence the common name. The sori are either scattered or arranged in two regular rows in between the secondary veins.

Trivia
"Kabkab", one of the plant's nicknames ("kabkaban" collectively for clumps of ferns), was the inspiration for the old name of Carcar, one of the towns of the province of Cebu in the Philippines. This was due to the abundance of these fern plants in the trunks and branches of the large trees, as well as the lowlands surrounding the area of the town. Currently, the term "kabkaban" refers to the town's local festival in honor of St. Catherine of Alexandria, which celebrates the town's musical history. The Kabkaban Festival is held around the 23rd to the 25th of November.

References

Aglaomorpha
Ferns of Asia
Plants described in 1841